White Gold is a 2010 South African film, directed by Jayan Moodley and Paul Railton, produced by African Lotus Productions in association with Serendipity Productions and African Mediums. Its release was timed to coincide with the celebrations of the 150th anniversary of Indian presence in South Africa. The film is a historical drama revolving around the experiences of Indian indentured labourers recruited for the sugar plantations of the 19th-century Colony of Natal, and their children and grandchildren. Jayan Moodley, who wrote the script and co-directed, was inspired by her own family history.

References

External links
 
 Official trailer

2010 films
Films set in the British Empire
South African Indian films
English-language South African films
2010s Hindi-language films
2010s Tamil-language films
2010s English-language films
South African multilingual films